SC Schwarz-Weiß Bregenz or SW Bregenz, formerly SC Bregenz, is an Austrian association football club from Austria, based in the town of Bregenz. They currently play in Austria's third tier  Eliteliga Vorarlberg.

History

The club was founded in 1919. They participated in the UEFA Intertoto Cup in 2002 and 2004, exiting in the Second and First rounds respectively. They club was dissolved in 2005 and the youth system continued under the name SC Bregenz. The senior team was admitted to the 5th level of the Austrian football pyramid and adapted the traditional black and white club colours of the former SW Bregenz in the 2009/10 season. On 8 July 2013 the club was renamed Schwarz-Weiß Bregenz again and they also took over the logo of the former club.

The club was relegated from Austrian Regionalliga West in 2016.

Stadium
They play their home games at the ImmoAgentur Stadion.

UEFA club competition results 
As of 10 July 2012.

References

External links 
  

Football clubs in Austria
SW Bregenz
Association football clubs established in 1919
Sport in Vorarlberg
1919 establishments in Austria